Daniela Fejerman (born 1964) is an Argentine director and film writer and a licensed psychologist.  Her brother is Argentine musician Andy Chango. Her sister is Laura Fejerman. She has worked together with Inés París for 13 years.

Filmography
A mí quien me manda meterme en esto, director and writer with Inés París. (1997)
Vamos a dejarlo, director and writer with Inés París. (1999)
Sé quién eres, writer (2000)
A mi madre le gustan las mujeres,  director and writer with Inés París. (2002)
Semen, una historia de amor, director and writer with Inés París. (2005)
 7 minutos, director and writer with Ángeles González-Sinde (2009)
 Alguien que cuide de mí, director and writer with Elvira Lindo (2023)

Awards
Nominated for a Goya for best new director with Inés París for A mi madre le gustan las mujeres.

See also
 List of female film and television directors
 List of LGBT-related films directed by women

References

External links
Daniela Fejerman

Inés París y Daniela Fejerman 7 July 2005 interview, El Mundo newspaper 
Daniela Fejerman filmography 

1964 births
Living people
Argentine film directors
Argentine women film directors